Philip Musgrave may refer to: 

Sir Philip Musgrave, 2nd Baronet (1607–1678), MP for Westmorland and a Royalist army officer
Philip Musgrave (administrator) (1661–1689), Ordnance officer and MP for Appleby
Sir Philip Musgrave, 6th Baronet (c. 1712–1795), MP for Westmorland
Sir Philip Musgrave, 8th Baronet (1794–1827), MP for Petersfield and Carlisle

See also 
 Musgrave (surname)
 Musgrave baronets